The Golaghat Municipal Board or the GMB, established in 1920, one of the oldest civic bodies of the state of Assam, formed before Indian Independence of 1947, is responsible for the civic infrastructure and administration of the city of Golaghat. The Golaghat Municipal Board with a population of about 60 thousand is Golaghat sub-district's only municipal board located in Golaghat sub-district of Golaghat district in the state Assam in India. There are 13 wards in the city, and the board has the total administration over 9,646 houses to which it supplies basic amenities like water and sewerage. It is also authorized to build roads within Municipal Board limits and impose taxes on properties coming under its jurisdiction.

History 

Golaghat is one of the oldest tea urban centres of Assam. The area is known for rich cultural heritage, its contribution during India's freedom struggle, tea gardens, forest reserves, including the world heritage site - Kaziranga National Park, Robin's Children and ABITA Natural History Museum, Hot water springs, besides the recent addition being Numaligarh Refinery Limited.

Golaghat has been the headquarter of oldest sub-division for over 150 years since 1839 and declared as a District in 1987. Golaghat Municipality Board is a historical one in terms of its age (since 1920).

General elections 

The general elections for the elected wing of the corporation is held every 5 years. For the last civic body election, as many as 51 candidates from all the major parties, including the BJP, AGP and Congress, had filed their nomination papers.

Services 
The GMB is responsible for certain obligatory services, some of which include:

Road maintenance under the municipal area jurisdiction
Lane dividers and underground cabling for street light installations
Sewerage and sanitation
Water treatment and distribution 
Maintenance of recreational parks  
Maintenance of Golaghat Civil Hospital
Updates to street signs / bye-lanes
Improvement of traffic points

See also
Golaghat
Golaghat district

References

Golaghat district
Local government in Golaghat
Local government in Assam
1920_establishments_in_India